Archboldomys, the shrew-mice, are a genus of rodents in the family Muridae. They are carnivores that feed on invertebrates much like shrews do. An apparently smaller relatives of the true shrew-rats Chrotomys and Rhynchomys, Archboldomys are somewhat convergent to the more distantly related Crunomys.

The species are:
 Mount Isarog shrew-mouse, Archboldomys luzonensis
 Large Cordillera shrew-mouse, Archboldomys maximus

References

  (2006): A new species of the shrew-mouse, Archboldomys (Rodentia: Muridae: Murinae), from the Philippines. Systematics and Biodiversity 4(4): 489–501.  (HTML abstract)
  (2005): Superfamily Muroidea. In: : Mammal Species of the World: A Taxonomic and Geographic Reference: 894–1531. Johns Hopkins University Press, Baltimore.
  (1982): Results of the Archbold Expeditions. No. 110. Crunomys and the small-bodied shrew rats native to the Philippine Islands and Sulawesi (Celebes). Bulletin of the American Museum of Natural History 174(1): 1-95.

 
Rodents of the Philippines
Rodent genera
Taxa named by Guy Musser
Taxonomy articles created by Polbot
Archboldomys